Coleophora coracipennella is a moth of the family Coleophoridae. The species is found in Europe and was first described by Jacob Hübner in 1796.

The moth flies from June to July depending on the location.

The larvae feed on Prunus spinosa, Prunus padus, Prunus cerasus and other Prunus species, as well as on apples  and Crataegus. It is light brown at first, but darker later. The rear end is trivalved and the mouth opening is around 45 degrees. The larvae live at the underside of the leaves, and make sizable fleck mines.

Distribution
The moth is known from Europe, where it is found from Germany to Sicily and from Great Britain to Romania. It has also been recorded from Estonia and southern Russia.

References

External links
 
 Coleophora coracipennella at UKMoths

coracipennella
Leaf miners
Moths described in 1796
Moths of Europe
Taxa named by Jacob Hübner